Deportivo Niefang is an Equatoguinean football club based in the city of Niefang.

Honours
Equatoguinean Premier League
Winners (1): 2010

Equatoguinean Cup
Winners (4): 2005, 2011, 2013, 2015

Performance in CAF competitions
CAF Confederation Cup: 1 appearance
2018 –

Notable players

References

External links
Deportivo Niefang FC at Soccerway

Football clubs in Equatorial Guinea